Legislative elections were held in El Salvador on 10 March 1991. The result was a victory for the Nationalist Republican Alliance, which won 39 of the 84 seats. Voter turnout was 44.7%.

Results

References

Bibliography
Political Handbook of the world, 1991. New York, 1992. 
Acevedo, Carlos. 1991. "Las novedades de las elecciones del 10 de marzo." Estudios centroamericanos (ECA) 46, 507-508:71-76 (enero-febrero 1991).
Córdova Macías, Ricardo and Andrew J. Stein. 1998. "National and local elections in El Salvador, 1982-1994." Dietz, Henry A. and Gil Shidlo, eds. 1998. Urban elections in democratic Latin America. Wilmington: SR Books. Pages 141-162.
Eguizábal, Cristina. 1992. "Parties, programs, and politics in El Salvador." Goodman, Louis W., ed. 1992. Political parties and democracy in Central America. Boulder: Westview Press. Pages 135-160.
Eguizábal, Cristina. 1992. "El Salvador: procesos electorales y democratización." Una tarea inconclusa: elecciones y democracia en America Latina: 1988-1991. 1992. San Jose: IIDH--CAPEL. Pages 41-65.
"Las elecciones del 10 de marzo." 1991. Estudios centroamericanos (ECA) 46, 509:225-248 (marzo 1991).
Lazo, José Francisco. 1993. Estrategia electoral 1994: la TRENZA. San Salvador: Centro de Investigación y Acción Social.
Lungo Uclés, Mario. 1996. El Salvador in the eighties: counterinsurgency and revolution. Philadelphia: Temple University Press. (Based on his El Salvador en los 80: contrainsurgencia y revolución. 1990. San Jose: EDUCA--FLACSO.)
Montgomery, Tommie Sue. 1995. Revolution in El Salvador: from civil strife to civil peace. Boulder: Westview.
Stahler-Sholk, Richard. 1994. "El Salvador's negotiated transition: from low-intensity conflict to low-intensity democracy." Journal of interamerican studies and world affairs 36, 4:1-60 (winter 1994).
Vickers, George R. 1992. "The political reality after eleven years of war." Tulchin, Joseph S. with Gary Bland, eds. 1992. Is there a transition to democracy in El Salvador? Boulder: Westview Press (Woodrow Wilson Center current studies on Latin America) Pages 25-58.
Zamora, Rubén. 1997. "Democratic transition or modernization? The case of El Salvador since 1979." Dominguez, Jorge I. and Marc Lindenberg, eds. 1997. Democratic transitions in Central America. Gainesville: University Press of Florida. Pages 165-179.

El Salvador
Legislative elections in El Salvador
1991 in El Salvador